Tariq Anwar (born 16 January 1951) is an Indian politician as member of the Indian National Congress (INC). He served as the Minister of State of Agriculture and Food Processing Industries between 2012 and 2014.

Anwar has been a member of the Indian Parliament for more than three decades – elected five times to the Lok Sabha, the lower house, from Katihar, and two times to the Rajya Sabha, the upper house, from Maharashtra. He quit the INC over a presidency dispute of the party in 1999 and formed the Nationalist Congress Party along with Sharad Pawar and P. A. Sangma, before resigning 19 years after, and re-joining the INC in 2018. Anwar has been appointed both general secretary in charge of poll-bound Kerala and a member of the Congress Working Committee (CWC).

Career 
Anwar joined the Indian National Congress in 1972. His political career began a student leader. He contested his first Lok Sabha election from Katihar on a Congress ticket in 1977 which he lost before winning three year later. He has been the national president of Indian Youth Congress. In 1989, he was offered the post of the minister of finance in the government of Bihar, headed by Satyendra Narayan Sinha.

In May 1999, Anwar along with other leaders of the INC, Sharad Pawar and P. A. Sangma, rebelled against a foreign-origin Sonia Gandhi being chosen as the party's Prime Minister-candidate ahead of the general election. In an open letter, they questioned her "experience and understanding of public life" in being able to rule a country "with a population of 980 million". A few days later, they were expelled from the party's prime membership for six years. They later quit the party and formed Nationalist Congress Party (NCP). However, the NCP chose to support the INC-led United Progressive Alliance for two terms at the centre between 2004 and 2014. In October 2012, Anwar was appointed Minister of State for Agriculture and Food Processing. During the time, he served as a member of the Rajya Sabha, the upper house of the Indian Parliament, representing Maharashtra.

In September 2018, he resigned from the NCP over colleague Pawar's clean chit to Prime Minister Narendra Modi in the Rafale deal controversy, and re-joined the INC the following month.

References

External links 
 Tariq Anwar profile at India.gov.in

1951 births
20th-century Indian Muslims
21st-century Indian Muslims
Living people
Indian Youth Congress Presidents
Nationalist Congress Party politicians from Bihar
Indian National Congress politicians from Bihar
Rajya Sabha members from Maharashtra
People from Arwal district
India MPs 1980–1984
India MPs 1984–1989
India MPs 1996–1997
India MPs 1998–1999
Lok Sabha members from Bihar
India MPs 2014–2019
People from Katihar
Politicians from Patna